Silny may refer to:

 Silný, a Czech surname
 Soviet destroyer Silny

See also